Jamie Harvey (born 15 August 1955) is a Scottish former professional darts player who played in Professional Darts Corporation (PDC) and British Darts Organisation (BDO) tournaments. He used the nickname Bravedart for his matches – a play on the lead character from the film Braveheart. As darts began to introduce entrance tunes for its players during the 1990s, Harvey used to come to stage whilst the tune "The Bonnie Banks o' Loch Lomond" was played.

Career

Having made his World Championship debut in 1992, Harvey was one of the players who started the Professional Darts Corporation (then known as the World Darts Council, WDC) in 1993 and played at every PDC World Championship between 1994 and 2006. 

His best performance came in 1996 at the Circus Tavern, when he reached the World Championship semi-finals but lost 1–5 to Dennis Priestley. Later that year he also reached the semi-finals of the World Matchplay – losing 9–13 to eventual champion Peter Evison. He never made the final of any of the major PDC tournaments, but has won the Antwerp Open and also the Scottish Masters in his home country. He remained one of the most popular players on the circuit throughout his career.

Although he has reached the quarter finals of the World Championship in 2001 and the quarter finals of the World Matchplay as recent as 2004, his ranking has slipped in the past few years. He started 2007 ranked 48 in the world, but failed to qualify for the World Championship for the first time that year. In the 2008 PDC World Darts Championship qualifiers, he won four matches before falling at the final hurdle to Jacko Barry and he slipped to 73rd in the PDC Order of Merit. He still competed at nine PDC Pro Tour non-televised events in 2007, but collected only £300 in prize money with a last 32 performance being his best. Harvey is now ranked 129th on the PDC Order of Merit.

Harvey is currently battling throat cancer. On 2 September 2009, he underwent surgery to remove a cancerous growth in his throat and had his voice box removed.

In 2011, Harvey returned to the BDO and plays just Scottish events.

World Championship and League results

BDO

 1992: 2nd round (lost to Kevin Kenny 2–3)
 1993: 1st round (lost to Mike Gregory 0–3)

PDC

 1994: Group stage (lost to Phil Taylor 1–3) & (lost to Jim Watkins 2–3)
 1995: Quarter-final (lost to Rod Harrington 2–4)
 1996: Semi-final (lost to Dennis Priestley 1–5)
 1997: Quarter-final (lost to Peter Evison 3–5)
 1998: Group stage (Beat John Ferrell 3–0) & (lost to Rod Harrington 2–3)
 1999: 2nd round (lost to Bob Anderson 2–3)
 2000: 2nd round (lost to Dennis Priestley 2–3)
 2001: Quarter-final (lost to Dave Askew 0–4)
 2002: 1st round (lost to Shayne Burgess 3–4)
 2003: 3rd round (lost to John Part 3-5)
 2004: 3rd round (lost to Steve Beaton 0–4)
 2005: 3rd round (lost to Roland Scholten 2–4)
 2006: 1st round (lost to Tomas Seyler 0–3)

Performance timeline

References

External links
Profile and stats on Darts Database

1955 births
Living people
Sportspeople from Glasgow
Scottish darts players
Professional Darts Corporation founding players
People from Barrhead
Sportspeople from East Renfrewshire